Wang Wenbo (born 2 February 1969 in Changchun) is a Paralympic athlete from China. He competes in standing throwing events, in the F36 classification for athletes with cerebral palsy. He was a former discus world record holder in his class.

At the 2008 Summer Paralympics, competing in a combined F35/36 discus event, he set a world record for F36 classified athletes but still only won a silver medal. He also competed in javelin and shot put. At the 2012 Summer Paralympics he won bronze in the F35/36 discus event.

References

1969 births
Sportspeople from Changchun
Paralympic athletes of China
Athletes (track and field) at the 2008 Summer Paralympics
Athletes (track and field) at the 2012 Summer Paralympics
Paralympic silver medalists for China
Living people
Chinese male javelin throwers
Chinese male discus throwers
World record holders in Paralympic athletics
Medalists at the 2008 Summer Paralympics
Medalists at the 2012 Summer Paralympics
Paralympic bronze medalists for China
Paralympic medalists in athletics (track and field)
21st-century Chinese people
Medalists at the 2010 Asian Para Games
Paralympic javelin throwers
Paralympic discus throwers